Duleek was a constituency represented in the Irish House of Commons until 1800.

History
In the Patriot Parliament of 1689 summoned by James II, Duleek was not represented.

 1661–1666 Patrick Tallant (died and replaced 1662 by Michael Jones) and Gabriel Bristow

Members of Parliament

1689–1801

Notes

References

Bibliography

Constituencies of the Parliament of Ireland (pre-1801)
Historic constituencies in County Meath
1800 disestablishments in Ireland
Constituencies disestablished in 1800